Niels Raaijmakers (born 16 January 2000) is a Dutch football player. He plays for PSV Eindhoven Amateurs.

Club career
He made his Eerste Divisie debut for FC Eindhoven on 31 August 2018 in a game against Almere City, as an added-time substitute for Charni Ekangamene.

References

External links
 

2000 births
Footballers from Eindhoven
Living people
Dutch footballers
Association football forwards
FC Eindhoven players
Eerste Divisie players